Glenn Alan Rogers (born 12 April 1977) is an Australian-born former cricketer who played international cricket for Scotland. A slow left-arm orthodox bowler, his ODI debut was in Chittagong against Bangladesh in December 2006.

External links 
 

1977 births
Living people
Scotland One Day International cricketers
Scotland Twenty20 International cricketers
Scottish cricketers
Cricketers from Sydney
Australian expatriate cricketers in the United Kingdom